Homo Hierarchicus: Essai sur le système des castes (1966) is Louis Dumont's treatise on the Indian caste system. It analyses the caste hierarchy and the ascendancy tendency of the lower castes to follow the habits of the higher castes. This concept was termed as Sanskritisation by MN Srinivas.

He states that the ideology of caste system is fundamentally contrary to our idea of egalitarian society and arises from the nature, conditions and limitations of realisation of such a society. We can not restrict ourselves to understand caste system only as a form of 'Social stratification'.

See also

 Names for the human species

References and Notes 

Anthropology books
Books about the caste system in India
1966 non-fiction books